Mongolian transliteration of Chinese characters is a system of transliterating the Standard Chinese pinyin readings of Chinese characters using the traditional Mongolian script that is used in Inner Mongolia, China.

References 

Chinese characters
Mongolian writing systems
Transliteration